Corio Bay Stingrays is a Big V club based in Geelong, Victoria. The club fields a team in the Men's Big V Division One and the Women's Big V Division Two. The club is affiliated with Corio Bay Basketball Association (CBBA) and Geelong United Basketball. The Stingrays play their home games at Geelong Basketball Netball Centre.

Between 2012 and 2019, the Stingrays competed in the Big V State Championship Men's division. The team was demoted in 2020 alongside a women's team being introduced for the first time.

Team history

Background in the CBL
Corio Bay Basketball Association entered an inaugural men's team in the Country Basketball League (CBL) for the 2009/10 season. The team was dubbed the Corio Bay-Barwon Bullets and had an undefeated season that ended with winning the North East Conference title and the overall CBL championship. The team was renamed the Corio Bay Stingrays for the 2010/11 season and joined the newly-formed South West Conference, once again taking out conference and overall championship honours. A CBL team continued on in 2011/12 and 2012/13, and then returned for a season in 2016/17.

Big V
Following their CBL success in 2010/11, the Stingrays applied to enter the Big V Division One competition for the 2012 season. Their Big V application was accepted, but after signing a number of big-name players, it was determined that the Stingrays would be competitive enough to enter the State Championship division.

The Stingray's inaugural Big V season saw them finish fourth in the regular season with a 12–8 record before losing 2–0 to the Ringwood Hawks in the semi-finals. They were led by American import Eric Williams, and Australians Jason Reardon, Stefan Osborne and Paul Hutchison.

In 2013, the Stingrays finished in third place with a 14–4 record and reached the grand final series, where they defeated the Hawks 2–0 to win the Big V championship. They were once again led by import Eric Williams, and Australians Jason Reardon, Stefan Osborne, Ma'alo Hicks and Liam Norton.

In 2014, the Stingrays recruited two new imports in guard Scooter Renkin and forward Duane Johnson. The pair led the Stingrays to a second-place finish with a 22–2 record. Renkin and Johnson both averaged over 20 points per game, and they were backed-up by teammates Jason Reardon, Ma'alo Hicks and Michael Rebula. The Stingrays reached the grand final series for the second straight year, where they lost 2–1 to the Hawks despite winning game one.

In 2015, after five years being coached by Dan Riches, the Stingrays appointed Mark Leader as head coach. Alongside import swingman Casey Walker, the team featured Jason Reardon, Ma'alo Hicks, Michael Rebula and Jordan Latham. The Stingrays finished second with a 20–4 record and reached their third straight grand final series. There they defeated the McKinnon Cougars 2–0 to win their second Big V championship.

In 2016, the Stingrays acquired imports Trevon Clayton and Dondray Walker. The pair were backed-up by teammates Jason Reardon, Ma'alo Hicks, Michael Rebula and Lewis Varley. The Stingrays were crowned minor premiers in 2016 for the first time in their history, as they finished the regular season atop the ladder with a 19–3 record. They advanced to their fourth straight grand final series, where they were defeated 2–0 by the Hawks.

Demoted; women's team addition
After three straight years of finishing in the bottom two of the league, the Stingrays were demoted to Division One in 2020. A Stingrays women's team was also introduced for the first time in Big V Division Two. In 2021 and 2022, the men remained in Division One and the women remained in Division Two.

References

External links
CBBA's official website
Corio Bay's CBL history
2016/17 CBL Women's Preview

Big V teams
Sport in Geelong
Basketball teams in Victoria (Australia)
Basketball teams established in 2009
2009 establishments in Australia